Boričevac is a village in Croatia.

Population

According to the 2011 census, Boričevac had 17 inhabitants.

Note: Till 1931 it was independent settlement and from 1948-1991 part of settlement (hamlet). From 1857-1880 include data for settlement of Mišljenovac. It became independent settlement again in 2001 from the settlement of Gajine.

1991 census 

For the ethnic composition of population in 1991 census see: Gajine.

Austro-hungarian 1910 census 

According to the 1910 census, settlement of Boričevac had 788 inhabitants in 4 hamlets, which were linguistically and religiously declared as this:

Literature 

  Savezni zavod za statistiku i evidenciju FNRJ i SFRJ, popis stanovništva 1948, 1953, 1961, 1971, 1981. i 1991. godine.
 Knjiga: "Narodnosni i vjerski sastav stanovništva Hrvatske, 1880-1991: po naseljima, autor: Jakov Gelo, izdavač: Državni zavod za statistiku Republike Hrvatske, 1998., ;

References

Populated places in Lika-Senj County
Serb communities in Croatia